Cristóbal Giovanni López Jara (born 13 May 1988) is a Chilean footballer who plays as a defender. His nickname is "Lapiz" (Pencil).

Career
He began his career in the youth system of Universidad de Chile before making his debut in the 2007 Apertura tournament against Universidad de Concepción. In 2008, he was loaned to Santiago Wanderers. He then returned in 2009 to Universidad de Chile to play Apertura 2009 Chilean Tournament and under a highly controversial game on 10 May, he played along with the "B team" against its traditional rival Universidad Católica de Chile, Universidad de Chile won 1-0.

Honours

Club
Universidad de Chile
Primera División de Chile (1): 2009 Apertura

External links
 BDFA profile

1988 births
Living people
Chilean footballers
Universidad de Chile footballers
Association football defenders
Santiago Wanderers footballers
Unión San Felipe footballers
Footballers from Santiago